Physalis angustifolia, the coastal groundcherry, is a species of flowering plant in the nightshade family. It is native to the Gulf Coast shoreline of the Southeastern United States, where it is found on maritime dunes and sands.

References

angustifolia